Wanjiru Kihoro (9 September 1953 – 12 October 2006) was an economist, writer and feminist activist from Kenya. She was one of the founders of the pan-African women's organisation Akina Mama wa Afrika (AMwA) and the Committee for the Release of Political Prisoners in Kenya (CRPPK), to protest the incarceration of Kenyans during Daniel arap Moi's regime.

Education and career
Kihoro graduated in economics from Columbia University, New York. She went on to complete an MA in development studies and a PhD at Leeds University during her working life in the late 1980s.

In 1982, Kihoro and her husband settled in London on exile from Kenya, at a time when Moi's arrests of dissidents had intensified, particularly of lawyers and academics. This is when she helped found the Committee for the Release of Political Prisoners in Kenya (CRPPK). With other activists, Kihoro produced and wrote for Kenya News, which was then investigated by Moi's government. She began work for The Africa Centre, London in 1984. Other work involved the All African Conference of Churches, the National Christian Council of Kenya and the United Church Board for World Ministries. 
 
In 1985, she co-founded Akina Mama wa Afrika as a community-based organisation for African women. In 1992, she helped found ABANTU for Development to train African women for positions of leadership. ABANTU was set up in Nairobi, Kenya, with subsequent offices set up in Nigeria and Ghana.

She returned to Kenya with her family when the new Kibaki government came to power in 2002.

Death
She died in 2006 after four years spent in a coma after a plane crash. During these four years, Kihoro's situation was contrasted with that of Terri Schiavo, with Kihoro's husband Wanyiri Kihoro and the rest of her family unanimous in believing she should continue to be on life support at Nairobi's Kenyatta National Hospital. At the time of her death, she was survived by her husband, and four children: Wangui, Pambana, Amandla and Wairimu.

On her death, The Guardian commented that there were "few African women as well known as Wanjiru Kihoro". Wangui wa Goro wrote in Pambazuka News: "[S]he was a leader, activist for democracy, freedom, human rights, equality and justice and always stood on the side of the oppressed, particularly women and the poor. She worked tirelessly and with courage, using her razor-sharp intellect to focus thousands, of the task at hand in creative ways which brought her knowledge and everyday life together in very practical ways."

References

External links
 Tribute website

1953 births
2006 deaths
Alumni of the University of Leeds
Columbia College (New York) alumni
Kenyan feminists
Kenyan women writers
Kenyan women's rights activists
Kenyan writers